Blanca Isabel Rodríguez González (born 13 April 1959) is a Uruguayan journalist, writer, and literature teacher. She is the host of Subrayado, the main newscast of Canal 10. She is the only woman host of a flagship news program in Uruguay, and has directed several journalistic series interviewing prominent national and international figures. She has received the Woman of the Year award on several occasions in recognition of her journalistic work.

Biography
She began her career as an anchorperson in 1988. She went on to co-host Canal 10's central newscast, Subrayado, with Jorge Traverso from 1990 to 2013. After Traverso left the central edition of Subrayado after 23 uninterrupted years, on 22 February 2013, Rodríguez remained at the forefront of the newscast. She has created several journalistic series on television and radio, which led her to interview prominent national and international personalities. She is the author of several books based on her own research and interviews.

March 2008 marked the 20th anniversary of her debut on Subrayado. In March 2010, she became longest-serving Uruguayan news host, having worked continuously since 1988.

She has received numerous honors throughout her career, including the Woman of the Year Award, organized annually in Uruguay to recognize and promote Uruguayan women in various fields.

She is the romantic partner of economist and politician Mario Bergara, a candidate for the Broad Front in the 2019 primaries. Rodríguez's name was mentioned to complete a presidential ticket.

Books
 Confidencias (1998), Cal y Canto
 Mujeres uruguayas (1999), Alfaguara, various authors
 El correo del general (2004), Aguilar, compilation
 Ministras (2010), Aguilar,

References

1959 births
21st-century Uruguayan educators
21st-century Uruguayan women writers
21st-century Uruguayan writers
Living people
Uruguayan television journalists
Uruguayan women journalists
Uruguayan television presenters
Uruguayan women educators
Uruguayan women television presenters
Writers from Montevideo